Devil Lady, known in Japan as , is a 1997 manga series written and illustrated by Go Nagai, and the sequel to Devilman. It was originally serialized by Kodansha from January 1997 to July 2000 in the magazine Weekly Morning, and later collected in 17 volumes. The story follows Jun Fudo, a model who can transform into the powerful Devil Lady and protects humanity from devil beasts and their creations.

The manga was adapted into a twenty-six episode anime series by TMS Entertainment from 1998−1999, which was released in the US by ADV Films in 2003–2004, and later available through streaming by Midnight Pulp. A manga crossover with Cutie Honey, another Nagai series, was published in 2013 under the title Cutie Honey vs. Devilman Lady.

Plot

Manga
Set in Japan after the events of Devilman, the story follows Jun Fudo, a teacher and former athlete who lives alone with her younger brother, Hikaru, while their father is away in the United States. For reasons unknown to her, Jun begins to experience unusual nightmares which cause her to have animalistic sexual urges. One day, she and some students are attacked by a group of demons during a school trip. The demons kill the male students and rape Jun and the female students. In the conflict, she transforms into a Devilman, killing the demons with her newfound strength. After that, a woman named Lan Asuka appears and says she was the one who awakened the beast within Jun.

Confused by her transformation, Lan Asuka, and her father's sudden appearance and experience, things became too complicated for Jun to understand. Through Professor Fudo's knowledge, he tells a tale of a strange phenomenon that occurred in shantytowns years ago. It was known as the "Devil Beast Syndrome" in which its inhabitants would transform into demons and rape women before eating them with no memories or intelligence of their previous lives and additionally giving them enhanced strength with other abilities.

Professor Fudo does not believe that their "Devil Beast Syndrome" transformation was supernatural, but was actually the next stage of human evolution, calling it "Nature's way of dealing with mankind's overpopulation". He also says that few people were genetically engineered to retain their conscience should the "Devil Beast Syndrome" occur in them, Jun being one of them. With Jun now becoming the Devil Lady, she fights for the sake of humanity to protect them from the devil beasts and their creations.

Jun, along with Asuka, fight several demons and become close friends. One day Jun investigates the Grumech Embassy she is put through a demonic ritual that opens the Gates of Hell and Jun falls to Hell. Here she meets a mysterious man who introduces himself as Akira Fudo. Jun recognizes Akira to be the man who she saw before in her visions. As Akira explains he is from a past that no longer exist, as God wiped the Earth out after Akira and Satan's battle at the end of Devilman. He offers to acts as guide on Jun's journey through Hell during which the two fall in love and have sex. Through their descent through Hell they also face other characters from Akira's past, including Silene/Sirene and Kaim. Once they reach the lowest point of Hell, they realize that the demon king is there frozen in ice, but Satan is nowhere to be found. On their way back Akira tells Jun about his past with Satan. However, when they reach the surface, Akira cannot follow Jun back to Earth. She promises to never forget him and leaves.

After Jun returns to world several things change, parts of the past are altered. Events that led her falling to Hell are missing. Jun keeps communicating with Akira through the Devilman Ghost custome she made, but slowly forgets his name. The only person she really feels close to is Asuka, who is revealed to be her half-sibling. She starts really opening up to her without knowing that she actually killed their mother with her supernatural powers.

In later chapters after the leader of the mysterious Cult of Dante, Ryo Utsugi, awakens the great demon lord Zennon by fusing with him and releases Hell's inhabitants into the world including demons, Devilman, and humans held in Hell, chaos and carnage break loose on Earth once again and the great battle between God's army and Satan's demonic forces is drawing closer and closer.

Asuka seduces and impregnates Jun while possessing a male form. Asuka reveals that she was born a male but chose to hide himself in a female form from the eyes of God. After Jun is forced to give birth in her giant Devilman form to a full-grown Akira Fudo, Asuka reveals the truth to Jun with the help of Psycho Jenny restoring her sealed memories: the half-siblings are actually the two halves of Satan who split himself in order to escape the time loop God threw him into and to be able to bring back Akira from Hell. After learning this, Jun fuses together with Asuka becoming Satan once again. Akira arrives greets his old friend/enemy. This time, however, Akira joins Satan in his fight against God's army approaching Earth. As Satan puts it, the Akira who was reborn in Hell is different than the Akira who was born on Earth, as he now understands Satan's quest against God.

Leading God's army is Archangel Michael, Satan's twin. When Akira notices this, Satan describes himself and his twin as the right and the left hands of God. Same powers, but different functions.

The battle's victor is not revealed. The manga ends with Satan telling Akira that true hope lies on the other side of the battle as they are launching their attack. The manga ends with a final shot of Earth with humanity once again exterminated and the age of "myth" drawing upon Earth once again.

Anime
Jun Fudo is a supermodel who is idolized by many. She also has a secret that not even she knows about at first, for within her lie the genes that hold the next step in the evolution of mankind, the same blood as the beast-like superhumans that terrorize the city. Unlike them, Jun manages to hold a tenuous grip onto her humanity, and gets  recruited by the mysterious Lan Asuka, member of a secret organization within the government aimed at controlling, if not eliminating, these berserk destroyers of mankind. Jun, as Devil Lady, must now exterminate her own kind, however, it is unclear how much longer she can keep her sanity in a situation she never chose to begin with. The story of the anime differs significantly from the manga, despite having similar beginnings - devils are not mystical beings but the next step of humanity's evolution. Unlike the manga, Devilman does not appear.

Characters
 / Devil Lady 
Jun is a successful supermodel in Tokyo when the story begins. She is a quiet and timid person who seems to avoid most social interactions, with two exceptions: she is generally open with her manager and very friendly with an aspiring teen model named Kazumi who now lives with her following the gruesome death of her parents from a beast attack. She is found by a woman named Lan Asuka, who forces her to confront a werewolf-like monster called a devil beast. As it tears into Jun, her powers awaken and she becomes a devil beast herself. She defeats the beast with her powers and reverts to her human form. Asuka speaks of her membership with a military unit known as the Human Alliance, whose purpose is to hunt down and kill all those who are affected with Devil Beast Syndrome. Asuka gives Jun an ultimatum; if Jun does not hunt for them, she will be hunted by them. Jun has no choice but to obey Asuka from that point on. However, she finds that it is not only Asuka's ultimatum that keeps her following Asuka's orders, but also something about Asuka that she cannot defy. As the series progresses, she becomes more independent.

 
Asuka is the woman who scouted Jun for the Human Alliance, and is a high-ranking government official. She is a cold, aggressive, and manipulative woman, who cares nothing for the people who work for her. When she forces Jun to confront the devil beast Wolver, she has no concern for Jun's survival; her theory that Jun is a devil beast was based only on a hunch. As the series progresses, however, even though she remains cold towards Jun, she starts to care about Jun's safety. She seems to have different intentions from her organization and does a great deal of work without their knowledge. She was born in Jersey City, New Jersey, United States to an American mother and a Japanese father. At the end of the anime, it is revealed that she is intersex and a powerful Devil Beast herself, who engineered the hunt for the Devil Beasts only to weed out the competition for when she can take over the world. She is mostly a female equivalent of Ryo from Devilman, but unlike him, is not a fallen angel.
 
 / Devilman / Devil Mask
Akira Fudo appears for the first time as an ethereal being in Lan Asuka's room accusing her that she was the reincarnation of Satan. Jun later meets him in Hell as Devilman, and he joins with her in the fight against Ryo. He only appears in the manga, but the supporting character Takeshi Maki is based on Akira Fudo, though.

 / Dante
In this storyline, Ryo Utsugi is the re-incarnation of the Italian poet Dante Alighieri. Only appears in the manga.

 
Aoi Kurosaki makes her first appearance in the 3rd Volume of the manga while in the anime she appears in episode 5 and she is described as Jun's old classmate and mortal enemy during their high school years while competing for the Olympics, as no matter how hard Jun tries to win, Aoi is faster. However, she is actually in love with Jun and the only way she thinks to express it is through rivalry. Her transformation into a devil beast started gradually when she was still young, as a result of her hatred for her step-father who sexually abused her and her own mother who ignored the abuse and also abused her as well. However, the devil beast had a personality of its own and would tease and mock Aoi. She distinctively has a manly body complete with short hair, appearing to that of a teenage boy-(but with women's breasts).

Vlava
Vlava is the deity of a fictitious European country. He resembles a lot to the Cretan minotaur with having a head which looks like the head of a cow. Appearing in the manga's seventh volume, he and his followers practice human sacrifice in the Grumech embassy. When Vlava and his followers descend to hell with Jun, he meets with Jinmen and forms an alliance with him to eliminate Devilman, who is protecting Jun. He is killed by Devilman in hell. Later on in the story, he reappears on Earth and joins with Dante's Devil Beast army.

Devil Lady
Jun's alter ego, Devil Lady, is the exact opposite of Jun. She is loud, violent, and temperamental. Her unforgiving and aggressive nature tends to make all of her battles very graphic. As Devil Lady, all of her senses are greatly increased and she has night vision. Her ability to heal is also highly amplified, bordering on regeneration. Her strength allows her to bend and twist steel girders, without struggle. She is able to fly via large wings that unfold from her back, and she can generate high-voltage electric currents to destroy her enemies instantly and form blades of energy around her arms or elbows to neatly slice through almost anything. Her most powerful ability is the giga-effect, which allows her to become a giant and fight other devil beasts that have grown in the same regard; while in this form, she can fly, and emit electricity from her hands similar to Great Mazinger's Thunder Break. In her empowered form, she can turn the wings on her head into razor sharp blades. Aside from the way she can retain her human conscious, her giga-effect ability is what many people and devil-beasts alike are after.

 
Kazumi is a young high school girl, an aspiring teen model, and an avid fan of Jun's, who she admires and laters meets during an audition when she entered the wrong building. They become close friends, with Jun acting as a big sister and mentor. Kazumi's parents are brutally killed by devil beasts who also try to kill Kazumi because they consider Jun a traitor and seek to punish her by targeting people close to Jun. However, Kazumi is spared when Jun in her Devil Lady persona dispatches the demons, saving her life; but due to the death of her parents, she temporarily goes to stay with relatives for the time being. The now orphaned Kazumi is later taken in by Jun with open arms, and is unaware of Jun's night life, although she strongly suspects something is wrong. As the series progresses, the relationship between Kazumi and Jun gradually progresses into a romantic one.

 
Bates is a scientist working at the Samuelson Labs in New Jersey, and is the current head of all Devil-beast research. He visits Japan to witness Jun's battles for this research, he expresses his views that the Devil-beasts are not evil and how he sympathizes with them. Later during Jun's battle with a Devil-beast in a television studio, she is saved by Bates, a Devil-man like Jun. Bates is the first devil beast before Jun to retain human faculties and to be used for the side of humans; while in this form, he possesses immense strength, two sharp horns on his head similar to Gaiking's, and can gain the physical attributes of other devil beasts by consuming their blood. However, unlike Jun, initially he lacks the giga-effect ability, and he sometimes acts as though he would prefer to give in to his beast side and run amok like all of the others.

 
Maeda is Asuka's personal secretary and also Jun's driver. Although he works for Asuka, he is more morally concerned with Jun's status not only as a human but also her demon side and he tries to help her as much as he can. As the storyline progresses, he ends up getting caught in a dangerous conspiracy, and a shocking truth is revealed as he learns more of Lan Asuka's past and the future that she will unleash.

 
Yuasa is Jun's long time modeling agent who has been there for her when she goes for auditions. He has a wife and daughter who loves him. After Jun's first devilman experience, Yuasa started to get worried about Jun. As the story progresses, Yuasa feelings for Jun grew and is falling for her.

 
A child who acts as the leader and organizer of the more militant Devil-Beasts whose intention is the genocide of all humans. Satoru is a clever and dangerous foe who Jun has underestimated several times. He considers Jun a traitor to his kind and he will use all of his resources to make her life a living nightmare. Unlike other characters in the series he is not referred to by name. Although he first appears in episode 3, he does not return until episode 14, assuming the role of the main antagonist up until the final episodes. His powers include morphing into a butterfly, a highly resilient body, butterfly wings, summoning crow guardians, levitation, mind control, and disabling electronics by thought.

 Devil Beasts
Also referred to as demons and beast creatures, the devil beasts are highly evolved carnivorous predators that have evolved from humans. Devil beasts can morph into humans when not actively hunting and can become stronger by consuming them. Some devil beasts can become much larger in size, this being referred to as the giga effect in the series and is caused by chemical reactions via electrical pulses in sensory organs.

Classifications as per the anime's official trading cards are next to the names in parentheses.
Wilber (Wolf Beast): appears in episodes 1 and 2. Powers include sharp claws and in his giga effect form an extra set of arms in the rib cage.
Kazar (Flying Beast): appears in episode 2. Powers include a beetle shell armed with very strong pincers and spear-like centipede legs. He is revived in episode 20 by Naperius.
Legzaimo (Insect Beast): appears in episode 3. Powers include summoning carnivorous earwigs and large rat fangs. He is revived in episode 20 by Naperius.
Harpi (Bird Beast): appears in episodes 3 and 14. One of the few Devil Beasts who can talk while transformed, works as an assassin for Satoru. Powers include flight and razor sharp talons. She resembles Silene from the original Devilman series and OVAs, being a blue-skinned, white-feathered harpy. She is revived in episode 20 by Naperius.
Germ (Plant Beast): appears in episode 4. Powers include extensible tentacles and emitting massive amounts of carbon dioxide. Her real name is Noriko Oda. She heavily resembles Biollante from the Godzilla movies.
Marmiga (Shark Beast): appears in episode 5. Powers include fast swimming, sharp teeth, a powerful tail, and mouth tentacles. Her real name is Aoi Kurosaki, she is a swimming champion.
Fayrace (Cat Beast): appears in episode 6. Powers include sharp claws and three whip-like tails. Her real name as a human is Hitomi Konno, a friend of Jun.
Airial (Weasel Beast): appears in episode 7. Resembles an anthropomorphic insectoid weasel with giant scythes. Powers include scythe blades for arms, speed, high jumping, a powerful tail, and can morph into his giga effect form after absorbing massive amounts of water.
Spargel (Dinosaur Beast): appears in episode 8. Powers include two tyrannosaurus-like heads near his face, high jumping, and four arms armed with sharp claws. He is revived in episode 20 by Naperius.
Argos (Eyeball Beast): appears in episode 9. Powers include flying eye probes from his body and a high resistance to pain. He has a serious fear of being watched and is easily burnt. Inspired by the mythical Greek creature Argos. 
Flame (Flame Beast): appears in episode 10. Powers include a fiery body, levitation, changing her size, telekinesis, and an extremely high resistance to pain. She will die if she stops emitting her flames. Her human identity is Remi Takashima.
Kilner (Chameleon Beast): appears in episode 11. Powers include wall crawling, a long  tongue and tail ideal for coiling and whipping, speed, a resistance to projectiles, camouflage similar to a chameleon, and in his giga effect form can emit electrical surges. As a human, he was known as Tachibana.
Faces (Faces Beast): appears in episode 12. Powers include speed, large bladed arms, can attach faces to his body to morph into his giga effect form, and in his giga effect form a second set of jaws on the abdomen and can emit slicing shockwaves from his extra blades on his arms. His human absorbing powers are very similar to those of Jinmen in the Devilman OVAs.
Jain (Snake Beast): appears in episode 13. Powers include a blood draining forked tongue, mind control saliva, and speed.
Agito: appears in episode 14. Powers include a large set of jaws on the abdomen and the shoulders and scythe-like arms. His jaws heavily resemble those of Dragonsaurus from Grendizer, Getter Robot G, Great Mazinger: Kessen! Daikaijuu.
Krahn: appears in episode 14. His only known powers are constricting octopus arms.
Guardian Crows (Crow Beasts): first appearance in episode 14. They serve as Satoru's bodyguards and possess extremely fast flight and invisibility. When not in battle they can shape-shift into normal crows as well as humans.
Tangrof (Frog Beast): appears in episode 16. Is in Giga form by default. Powers include coiling tongues, acidic saliva, and an explosive resistant jawed tail.
Imotail (Lizard Beast): appears in episode 16. Powers include disguising herself as humans, a coiling tail that can be controlled even after being detached, and wall crawling.
Chika: appears in episodes 18 to 21. Powers include sharp claws and speed. Unlike most devil beasts she and her friends have control over their transformations and are only hostile in self-defense instead of being mindless killers. She looks like a nekomimi (human with cat ears) by default, but can turn into a full-on anthropomorph feline with fur covering her body and a tail. She is friends with Jun and dies protecting the other Devil Beast children from the human taskforce hunting Devil Beasts.
Takeshi Maki: appears in episodes 19 to 25. His only known power is emitting electricity. He serves as an ex-py of Akira from the original Devilman and his devil beast form is mix between the manga and television series versions of Devilman; like Chiko and her friends he has control over his transformation and is not a mindless killer.
Megawamu: appears in episode 19. His only known power is his centipede-like spear legs.
Chiyoko: appears in episode 24. Her only known powers are a weak form of telepathy and an eye inside of her forehead that can be used for hypnosis and emit small sonic bursts. Unlike other devil beasts she does not full transform, primarily by influence through Jun.

Crusaders
Four bird-like devil beasts commanded by Satoru in the last third of the series with each possessing the ability to control a specific element. In episode 23 all four of them fuse with Satoru to become Giga Satoru.

Andrus (Eagle Beast): first appears in episode 17 and has the elemental ability of fire. He has a beaked eagle head and a feathered body, with his human face located on his chest. When untransformed, he has the alias of Higa Noboru. When he discusses his devil beast powers with Satoru one can see him painting an incomplete model of Mazinger Z.
Marfus (Vulture Beast): first appears in episode 19 and has the elemental ability of lightning. Other powers include activating innate devil beast transformations in humans that would otherwise not have them. He has a mostly human face but a body covered by feathers. His real name is Kotura Kasumi.
Napelius (Swan Beast): first appears in episode 19 and has the elemental ability of ice. Other powers include reviving dead devil beasts and regeneration. Unlike Andrus and Storus, she has a human face with bird-beak like horns. As a human her name is Izumi Kogure.
Storus (Owl Beast): first appears in episode 19 and has the elemental ability of wind. He heavily resembles an owl with a human face on his chest and goes by the human name of Kitano Yuichi.
Giga Satoru: first appears in episode 23. Powers include flight, explosive fire balls from the hands, energy covered metal spears, and can summon a sword that emits fire.

Production

The Devilman Lady manga was written and illustrated by Go Nagai, and was serialized from January 1997 to July 2000 in the manga magazine Weekly Morning. It was later collected in 17 tankōbon volumes by Kodansha from July 1997 to August 2000. The manga was published in Italy by d/visual.

Other media

Anime
A twenty-six episode anime series adaptation was produced by the animation studio TMS Entertainment, and was directed by Toshiki Hirano and written by Chiaki J. Konaka, with art direction by Toru Koga, character designs by Shinobu Nishioka, and monster designs by Hiroshi Maruyama. It aired in Japan on MBS TV from October 11, 1998 to May 9, 1999. ADV Films announced it had licensed the series in July 2002, with the first volume being released on January 7, 2003. Midnight Pulp started streaming the series on June 21, 2019. The Devil Lady anime's storyline is almost completely different from the manga, featuring only two characters from the original manga, Jun Fudo and Lan Asuka.

When creating the Devil Lady anime, many concepts and characters were changed from the original manga, which was more violent and sexually oriented. Jun, as a character is tougher and braver than in the original manga - she stands up for herself and does not often need others to save her, while in the manga; she is often a damsel in distress. She is also a teacher by profession. The character Kazumi also never appeared in the original manga, her looks are based upon the character Miki Makimura, Akira Fudo's female friend in the Devilman series.

Jun's two forms are also a tribute to both versions of Devilman. While her regular sized form is similar to Devilman (including satyr-like hairy legs) as he appears in the original manga, her Giga Effect form is a tribute to the 1972 anime version. In giga mode, she is a giant as tall as classic giant robots or monsters of the 70s, sports turquoise skin and yellow eyes, and does not have any body hair, which are all elements taken from the television version of Devilman.

Episodes

Cutie Honey vs. Devilman Lady
Cutie Honey vs. Devilman Lady, a crossover manga between Devil Lady and another series of Nagai's, Cutie Honey, was written and illustrated by Nagai and published by Akita Shoten in Champion Red Ichigo from June 5–October 4, 2013. The series was collected in a single tankōbon volume on December 20, 2013.

Reception

On June 12, 2015, the Chinese Ministry of Culture listed Devilman Lady among 38 anime and manga titles banned in China.

References

External links

1997 manga
1998 anime television series debuts
ADV Films
Censored television series
Demons in anime and manga
Devilman
Discotek Media
Go Nagai
Kaiju
Kodansha manga
Mainichi Broadcasting System original programming
New Jersey in fiction
Psychological horror anime and manga
Seinen manga
Television censorship in China
TMS Entertainment
Works banned in China
Yuri (genre) anime and manga